Jason Rarick (born October 21, 1969) is an American politician and a Republican member of the Minnesota Senate. He represents District 11 in east-central Minnesota. He was a member of the Minnesota House of Representatives from 2015 to 2019, representing District 11B.

Early life, education, and career
Rarick was born and raised in Pine City, Minnesota. He graduated from Pine City High School in 1988. In 1990, he graduated from Dunwoody College of Technology with an Associate of Applied Science (A.A.S.) degree after completing the electrical program. In 1992, Rarick was accepted into the St. Paul electrical union, International Brotherhood of Electrical Workers 110. In his union he served on 3 different committees, including the apprenticeship committee for over four years. He completed his apprenticeship in 1996 and became a Master Electrician in 1997. He also taught classes for the apprenticeship program for 2 and half years. In 2004, Rarick became a self-employed electrical contractor at Rarick Electric.

Minnesota House of Representatives

Elections
Rarick was elected to the Minnesota House of Representatives in 2014, defeating incumbent Tim Faust (DFL) by 7.52 percentage points (1,057 votes). He was sworn in on January 6, 2015.

Committee assignments
In the 89th legislative session, Rarick was a part of the Agriculture Policy, Capital Investment, and Environment and Natural Resources Policy and Finance Committees.

Minnesota Senate 
Rarick was elected to the Minnesota Senate in a special election on February 5, 2019.

Personal life
Rarick has a son, Quinn, born on October 31, 1995. Rarick has coached for local youth athletic programs, including soccer, football, basketball, and baseball, over the last 10 years. He is a lifelong member of St. Joseph’s Catholic Church in Beroun, Minnesota. He grew up being an altar server and a lector, and is still a lector and a trustee. He has also been a member of the Knights of Columbus for 25 years. Rarick enjoys deer hunting, turkey hunting, camping, canoeing, watching sports, and snowmobiling.

References

External links

 Official Senate website
 Official campaign website

1969 births
Living people
People from Pine City, Minnesota
Republican Party members of the Minnesota House of Representatives
Republican Party Minnesota state senators
21st-century American politicians